A Masculine Ending is a novel by Joan Smith. It was first published in 1987 by British firm Faber and Faber.

1992 Television Adaptation 
The story was adapted for television in 1992. The cast included:

Janet McTeer – Loretta Lawson 
Imelda Staunton – Bridget Bennet 
Paul Brooke – Humphrey Morris 
Suzanna Hamilton – Veronica Puddephat 
Joanna McCallum – Miriam Morris 
Kevin McNally – Andrew Gardner 
Bill Nighy – John Tracey 
Clarke Peters – Theo Sykes 
Greg Wise – Jamie Baird 
Buki Armstrong - Bethany Edwards
Charlotte Cornwell – Insp. Parkinson 
Matyelock Gibbs - Elizabeth Grant
Peter Lovstrom - Arthur Goodchild
Andrew Seear - Coroner
Richard Vernon – Miriam's father
Phillip Anthony - Mr Koogan
 Yves Aubert as French porter
Nigel Bradshaw - Hugh Puddephat
Lucy Briers - Student
Lolita Chakrabarti - Sue
Sophia Diaz - Sylvie
Jennifer Gibson - Melanie Gandell
Toby Whithouse - Student
Harry Davenport, Kate McEnery, Simon Owen, and Matthew Owens - The Morris Children

External links
A Masculine Ending at the Internet Movie Database

1987 British novels
British crime novels
British novels adapted into films
Faber and Faber books